Rosella Cicognani (born 1 October 1939) is a retired Italian gymnast. Together with her elder sister Miranda she competed in the 1956 and 1960 Summer Olympics with the best individual result of 16th place on uneven bars in 1960.

References

1939 births
People from Forlì
Italian female artistic gymnasts
Gymnasts at the 1956 Summer Olympics
Gymnasts at the 1960 Summer Olympics
Olympic gymnasts of Italy
Living people
Sportspeople from the Province of Forlì-Cesena